Niklas Stråhlén (born 4 September 1987) is a Swedish former professional windsurfer.

Stråhlén  was born and raised in Gothenburg, Sweden.  He started competing as a professional windsurfer in 2006. He won the Swedish and Nordic Championships in 2007, and competed for Sweden in the World Championship for the first time in 2008. In 2009, he placed fifth in the total in the European Freestyle Pro Tour. In 2011, he shared the first rank on the European Freestyle Pro Tour.

During the winter, Stråhlén traveled to South Africa and Brazil to practice his routines and develop new tricks.

Facts
Sailnumber: S-4444
Homespot: Fiskebäck
Started windsurfing: 2002
Windsurfclub: GWC

References

External links

Swedish windsurfers
Sportspeople from Gothenburg
Living people
1987 births